The goods train locomotives of Class C VI were German steam engines built between 1899 and 1905 for the Royal Bavarian State Railways (Königlich Bayerische Staatsbahn). It had great similarity to the Prussian G 5.4, but had a higher boiler overpressure and better riding qualities. In all the Bavarian state railways procured 83 engines of this type over that period. More machines with slight modifications were acquired between 1907 and 1909. These 37 engines were given the designation G 3/4 N. The Deutsche Reichsbahn inherited 64 Class C VI and 32 Class G 3/4 N engines. These were given operating numbers 54 1301–1364 and 54 1401–1432. The Class C VII locomotives remained in service until 1931, their Class G 3/4 N sister locomotives until 1935.

Both variants were equipped with a Bavarian 2'2' T 18 tender.

See also
 Royal Bavarian State Railways 
 List of Bavarian locomotives and railbuses

References

External links
 Railways of Germany forum

2-6-0 locomotives
C VI
Standard gauge locomotives of Germany
Krauss locomotives
Maffei locomotives
Railway locomotives introduced in 1899
1′C n2v locomotives
Freight locomotives